Choele Choel is the capital of the department of Avellaneda in the Argentine province of Río Negro, and the most important settlement within the Valle Medio ("Middle Valley") agricultural area of the Río Negro River in Patagonia.

Overview

Choele Choel is located at the intersection of National Routes #22 and #250, around 1000 kilometres from Buenos Aires, 180 from General Roca, 193 from the Las Grutas beach resort, and 460 from Puerto Madryn. It has a population of 10,642.

Its long distance bus terminal is a common stop for buses going to both sea-side Patagonia (Puerto Madryn, Río Gallegos, Ushuaia) and North-Andean Patagonia (Bariloche, El Bolsón).

During the 1990s, the airport used to serve regular flights to Buenos Aires, but currently serves only infrequent private charters.

History
Originally named Nicolás Avellaneda, it was founded on July 9, 1879 by General Conrado Villegas. After a flood, the inhabitants moved to a place known as Pampa de los Molinos. They would stay there until March 18, 1882, when the settlement was moved to its current location.

The town acquired special importance during the Conquest of the Desert, when the border between the white man and the Native Americans was pushed south the shore of the Río Negro River.

In 1883, a post office was installed in the town. Salesians arrived in 1890. The Provincial School #10 was created in 1904, and in 1917 the Library. Irish Argentine writer Rodolfo Walsh was born in the town in 1927.

In the 1900s a group of Welsh settlers who were considering leaving Argentina were granted land in Choele Choel. Choele Choel is home to a sizable Russian community; besides the European immigrant communities common to most of Argentina, the town received refugees from Laos in the 1970s.

Etymology
There are several versions regarding the meaning of Choele Choel: it might be from the Mapuche language, translated as "yellow flower race," or from the Tehuelche language ("small river rolling-stones"). Another version translates it as "bark scarecrows."

Climate
Choele Choel has a semi-arid climate (Köppen climate classification BSk). Cloudy days are common during winter, averaging 7–9 days from June to August, although sunny days can occur as well. Summers are hot, dry and sunny, with daytime temperatures averaging  and cool nighttime temperatures, averaging . Precipitation is low, averaging  which is fairly evenly distributed throughout the year.

Access 
Choele Choel also has an authorised airport for small private planes and helicopter arrivals.

Activities 
The most developed activities in this location are cattle breeding, agriculture, and manufacturing of raw materials such as tomatoes, apples, pears, strawberries, etc. into sauces and jellies.

References

Populated places in Río Negro Province
Populated places established in 1879
Cities in Argentina
Argentina
Río Negro Province